Kairat Almaty may refer to:

 FC Kairat, football club
 AFC Kairat, futsal club